West Lodi is an unincorporated community in Reed Township, Seneca County, Ohio, United States.

History
West Lodi was laid out and platted in 1838. A post office called West Lodi was established in 1843, and remained in operation until 1932.

References

Populated places in Seneca County, Ohio